The 1977–78 European Cup was the 13th edition of the European Cup, IIHF's premier European club ice hockey tournament. The season started on September 27, 1977, and finished on August 29, 1979.

The tournament was won by CSKA Moscow, who beat Poldi Kladno in the final

First round

 
 Tappara,   
 Brynäs IF   :  bye

Second round

Third round

 Poldi Kladno   :  bye

Fourth round

 Dynamo Berlin   :  bye

Semifinals

 CSKA Moscow   :  bye

Final

References 
 Season 1978

1977–78 in European ice hockey
IIHF European Cup